Ashdown may refer to:

People 
Ashdown (surname)

Places
United Kingdom
Ashdown, a historical name for an unspecified region of the Berkshire Downs
Battle of Ashdown, 871 A.D.
Ashdown Forest in East Sussex
United States
Ashdown, Arkansas
Ashdown House (disambiguation), several in the UK and the U.S.

Other uses 
Ashdown Engineering, British manufacturer of instrument amplifiers